Defu Industrial Park is an industrial estate, a subzone of Hougang in the northeast region of Singapore, located at the fringe of Hougang New Town.

Defu will be expanded to two million square metres (sq m) of industrial space for various industries.

References 

Places in Singapore